The Latin Grammy Award for Best Pop/Rock Album is an honor presented annually at the Latin Grammy Awards, a ceremony that recognizes excellence and creates a wider awareness of cultural diversity and contributions of Latin recording artists in the United States and internationally. It is one of the new categories added for the Latin Grammy Awards of 2012

The description of the category at the 2020 Latin Grammy Awards states that "a Pop/Rock album is one that stands out for combining Pop-related melodies/words with Rock elements or vice versa. The appeal of this genre lies in the addition of Pop melodies that, when combined with riffs typical of Rock, create a combination that is classified as Pop/Rock, but where the former predominates in terms of general themes."

The albums Algo Sucede by Julieta Venegas, Mis Planes Son Amarte by Juanes, Cargar la Suerte by Andrés Calamaro and La Conquista del Espacio by Fito Paez have won this award and also received a nomination for Album of the Year while Somos by Jarabe de Palo was the first album to be nominated for both categories.

Winners and nominees

2010s

2020s

References

External links
Official site of the Latin Grammy Awards

 

Pop rock albums
Latin Grammy
Pop Rock Album
Pop Rock Album
Pop Rock Album
Pop Rock Album
Awards established in 2012